William James Taylor (May 3, 1919 – June 12, 1990) was a Canadian professional ice hockey player in the National Hockey League (NHL) from 1939 to 1948.

Playing career
Taylor began his NHL career with the Toronto Maple Leafs in 1939–40. He played in Toronto for five seasons, and won the Stanley Cup in 1942 before being traded to the Detroit Red Wings for Harry Watson at the start of the 1946–47 season. While in Detroit, he set an NHL record for most assists in one game (7) against the Chicago Black Hawks. Wayne Gretzky has since matched that record. After only one season in Motown, he was dealt to the Boston Bruins for his last NHL season, 1947–48. That last season saw him play 39 games for the Bruins and two games for the Rangers. His career was cut short when Clarence Campbell expelled him and Don Gallinger for gambling violations similar to the Black Sox scandal in baseball. 

Taylor was finally reinstated by the NHL in 1970. In 323 career regular season games, he scored 87 goals and 267 points. His son, also named Billy Taylor, also played professional hockey.

Career statistics

External links

1919 births
1990 deaths
Boston Bruins players
Canadian ice hockey centres
Detroit Red Wings players
New York Rangers players
Pittsburgh Hornets players
Pittsburgh Penguins scouts
Ice hockey people from Winnipeg
Stanley Cup champions
Toronto Maple Leafs players
Canadian expatriate ice hockey players in the United States